Central Park is a station on the Red line of Kaohsiung MRT in Sinsing District, Kaohsiung, Taiwan. The station is named after the nearby Central Park.

Station Overview

The station is a two-level, underground station with an island platform and three exits. It is 197 meters long and is located at the intersections of Zhongshan 1st Rd., Minsheng 2nd Rd., and Wufu 3rd Rd.

It was originally planned to be named "Shinkuchan Station", but was later changed to its current name. The station was designed by British architect Richard Rogers. Windmill-shaped flowers cover the courtyard grass areas.

Around the Station
 Central Park
 Glory Pier
 Holy Rosary Cathedral
 Urban Spotlight Arcade
 Shinkuchan
 Talee's Department Store
 Star Place Department Store
 Datong Department Store (Wufu Branch)
 Sinsing High School
 Sinsing Elementary School
 Datong Elementary School
 Datong Hospital

References

2008 establishments in Taiwan
Kaohsiung Metro Red line stations
Railway stations opened in 2008